Soskovsky District is an administrative and municipal district (raion), one of the twenty-four in Oryol Oblast, Russia. It is located in the west of the oblast. Its administrative center is the rural locality (a selo) of Soskovo. Population: 5,982 (2010 Census);  The population of Soskovo accounts for 30.0% of the district's total population.

See also
Yelkovo

References

Notes

Sources

Districts of Oryol Oblast